Anthony Forde may refer to:
 Anthony Forde (darts player) (born 1962), Barbardian darts player
 Anthony Forde (footballer) (born 1993), Irish footballer for Oxford United

See also
Tony Ford (disambiguation), various people